The Villahermosa Mexico Temple is the 85th operating temple of the Church of Jesus Christ of Latter-day Saints (LDS Church).

History
In 1972 the first ward building was built in the state of Tabasco.  That building later became a stake center (a larger congregation building consisting of more than one ward) and was torn down in 1999 so the temple could be built. At the time of the temple's building, there were 23,000 members in the area. Counselor in the First Presidency Thomas S. Monson dedicated the Villahermosa Tabasco Temple on 21 May 2000.

The temple is located on the Isthmus of Tehuantepec near the Gulf of Mexico coast. The temple's exterior is white marble and like most of the small temples, being built around the world, has a single spire with a statue of the angel Moroni.

In 2020, like all the church's other temples, the Villahermosa Mexico Temple was closed due to the COVID-19 pandemic.

See also

 Comparison of temples of The Church of Jesus Christ of Latter-day Saints
 List of temples of The Church of Jesus Christ of Latter-day Saints
 List of temples of The Church of Jesus Christ of Latter-day Saints by geographic region
 Temple architecture (Latter-day Saints)
 The Church of Jesus Christ of Latter-day Saints in Mexico

References

Additional reading

External links
Villahermosa Mexico Temple Official site
Villahermosa Mexico Temple at ChurchofJesusChristTemples.org

20th-century Latter Day Saint temples
Buildings and structures in Tabasco
Temples (LDS Church) completed in 2000
Temples (LDS Church) in Mexico
2000 establishments in Mexico
Villahermosa